Maksym Ihorovych Bilyi (born 21 June 1990) is a Ukrainian professional footballer who plays as a defender.

Club career

Hajduk Split

Bilyi joined 1. HNL side HNK Hajduk Split in June 2015. He made his debut for the Whites in the 2015–16 UEFA Europa League 1st Qualifying Round match against Estonian side JK Sillamäe Kalev at the Sillamäe Kalevi Stadium on 2 July 2016. He came on as a substitute, playing the last quarter of an hour. He also came on as a substitute in the second leg, a 6–2 win at the Stadion Hrvatski vitezovi, playing the last 10 minutes. Bilyi made his 1. HNL debut against Slaven Belupo at the Poljud Stadium, playing the full 90 minutes in a 2–2 draw. The central defender went on to make himself a key part of the Hajduk starting eleven, playing 35 matches in all competitions in the 2015–16 HNK Hajduk Split season. On 4 September 2016, Bilyi was released by Hajduk.

FC Anzhi Makhachkala
On 4 February 2017, Bilyi signed for FC Anzhi Makhachkala until the end of the 2017–18 season. On 19 June 2017, he was released by Anzhi after not playing any games for the main squad.

FC Mariupol 

On 16 July 2017, Bilyi signed for FC Mariupol.

Honours 
2009 UEFA European Under-19 Football Championship: Champion

References

External links

 

1990 births
Living people
Ukrainian footballers
Ukraine youth international footballers
Ukraine under-21 international footballers
Ukrainian Premier League players
Ukrainian First League players
Ukrainian Second League players
Croatian Football League players
FC Shakhtar Donetsk players
FC Shakhtar-3 Donetsk players
FC Zorya Luhansk players
FC Stal Alchevsk players
HNK Hajduk Split players
FC Anzhi Makhachkala players
FC Mariupol players
FC Rukh Lviv players
FC Chornomorets Odesa players
Ukrainian expatriate footballers
Expatriate footballers in Croatia
Ukrainian expatriate sportspeople in Croatia
Expatriate footballers in Russia
Ukrainian expatriate sportspeople in Russia
Association football defenders
Sportspeople from Dnipropetrovsk Oblast